Season 1 of Dance Plus premiered on 26 July 2015 and broadcast on STAR Plus. The season is produced by Frames Productions. The tagline of the season was Ise Kehte Hain Dance (lit. This is called Dance). The auditions for the season were carried out in thirteen cities in India, between 3 June 2015 and 11 October 2015.

The season is hosted by Raghav Juyal.

Super judge
Remo D'Souza, the famous and talented choreographer who was earlier a part of the Colors' celebrity dance show Jhalak Dikhhla Jaa, and Zee TV's dance show Dance India Dance was the super judge of the season.

Mentors
There were three mentors of the season:
Dharmesh Yelande
Sumeet Nagdev
Shakti Mohan

Teams

Special guests

References

External links
 Dance Plus (season 1) on Hotstar.

2015 Indian television seasons